This is a list of video games that have sold the highest number of software units worldwide. The best-selling video game to date is Minecraft, a sandbox game released by Mojang in May 2009 for a wide range of PC, mobile and console platforms, selling more than 238 million copies across all platforms. Grand Theft Auto V and EA's Tetris are the only other known video games to have sold over 100 million copies. The best-selling game on a single platform is Wii Sports, with nearly 83 million sales for the Wii console.

Among the top 50 best-selling video games on this list, over half were developed or published by Nintendo, including four of the top ten; four Nintendo titles were published with their affiliate, The Pokémon Company. Other publishers with multiple entries in the top 50 include Activision and Rockstar Games with five games each, Electronic Arts and Namco Bandai with two games. Nintendo EAD is the developer with the most games in the top 50, with thirteen titles on the list, followed by Game Freak with six Pokémon games. The oldest game in the top 50 is Pac-Man, released in May 1980, while the most recent is Animal Crossing: New Horizons, released in March 2020.

Games reported on by player count instead of official sales figures, such as registered accounts, subscriptions, or free-to-play ownership, are included on the list of most-played video games by player count instead. For the best-selling video game franchises, see the list of best-selling video game franchises. Games reported on by gross revenue are included on the list of highest-grossing arcade games and list of highest-grossing mobile games.

List

See also 
 List of best-selling video game franchises
 List of fastest-selling products
 List of highest-grossing media franchises
 List of most-played mobile games by player count
 Lists of best-selling video games by platform
 List of highest-grossing mobile games
 List of highest-grossing arcade games

Notes

References